Johnny Banham (born 1943–1992) was a male former boxer who competed for England.

Boxing career
Banham was the ABA London champion in 1972 after winning the 1972 light-heavyweight championships.

He represented England in the -81 kg light-heavyweight division, at the 1970 British Commonwealth Games in Edinburgh, Scotland.

He was a member of the Metropolitan Police Boxing Club and the Fitzroy Lodge ABC.

References

English male boxers
1943 births
1992 deaths
Boxers at the 1970 British Commonwealth Games
Light-heavyweight boxers
Commonwealth Games competitors for England